A hypertranscendental function or transcendentally transcendental function is a transcendental analytic function which is not the solution of an algebraic differential equation with coefficients in Z (the integers) and with algebraic initial conditions.

History

The term 'transcendentally transcendental' was introduced by E. H. Moore in 1896; the term 'hypertranscendental' was introduced by D. D. Morduhai-Boltovskoi in 1914.

Definition

One standard definition (there are slight variants) defines solutions of differential equations of the form
,
where  is a polynomial with constant coefficients, as algebraically transcendental or differentially algebraic. Transcendental functions which are not algebraically transcendental are transcendentally transcendental. Hölder's theorem shows that the gamma function is in this category.

Hypertranscendental functions usually arise as the solutions to functional equations, for example the gamma function.

Examples

Hypertranscendental functions
 The zeta functions of algebraic number fields, in particular, the Riemann zeta function
 The gamma function (cf. Hölder's theorem)

Transcendental but not hypertranscendental functions 
 The exponential function, logarithm, and the trigonometric and hyperbolic functions.
 The generalized hypergeometric functions, including special cases such as Bessel functions (except some special cases which are algebraic).

Non-transcendental (algebraic) functions
 All algebraic functions, in particular polynomials.

See also

Hypertranscendental number

Notes

References
 Loxton,J.H., Poorten,A.J. van der, "A class of hypertranscendental functions", Aequationes Mathematicae, Periodical volume 16  
 Mahler,K., "Arithmetische Eigenschaften einer Klasse transzendental-transzendenter Funktionen", Math. Z. 32 (1930) 545-585.
 

Analytic functions
Mathematical analysis
Types of functions